Hunt Mountain is a mountain,  high, which stands in the northern part of the Holyoake Range and is its highest point.  Mapped by the southern party of the New Zealand Geological Survey Antarctic Expedition (1960–61) and named for Captain Peter John Hunt, RE, leader of the party.

References

Mountains of the Ross Dependency
Shackleton Coast